Brass Fever is the debut album by American jazz/R&B group Brass Fever, recorded in 1975 and released on the Impulse! label.

Reception
The AllMusic review states: "Brass Fever is unapologetically funky, and this very enjoyable LP (which is the band's most essential release) is strictly for those who like their jazz laced with lots of R&B".

Track listing
 "Lady Marmalade" (Bob Crewe, Kenny Nolan) - 5:58 
 "Djingi" (B. Branynon) - 6:51 
 "Sunshine Superman" (Donovan Leitch) - 6:28 
 "Back at the Chicken Shack" (Jimmy Smith) - 7:26 
 "Bach Bone" (Johann Sebastian Bach) - 7:40

Personnel
Buddy Collette - flute
Oscar Brashear - trumpet  
George Bohanon, Garnett Brown, Charlie Loper, Frank Rosolino - trombone 
John Handy - alto saxophone
Lee Ritenour - electric guitar
Sonny Burke - electric piano
Phil Wright - piano, organ, clavinet
Scott Edwards - electric bass
Shelly Manne - drums
Eddie "Bongo" Brown - percussion
Wade Marcus - conductor, arranger

References

Impulse! Records albums
Brass Fever albums
1975 debut albums
Albums arranged by Wade Marcus
Albums produced by Esmond Edwards